FB Gulbene (formerly "FB Gulbene-2005") is a Latvian football club based in Gulbene. The club plays its home matches at the Gulbenes Sporta Centrs stadium with capacity of 1,500 people. They were promoted to the Latvian Higher League for the 2015 season. However, on 3 June 2015, they were expelled from the top league and their results expunged on suspicion of match-fixing.

History
FB Gulbene were founded on May 24, 2005 as "FB Gulbene-2005". The club started its participation in the Latvian Second League in 2007, finishing in the 4th place. In 2008 FB Gulbene-2005 played in the Latvian First League and finished in the 14th place at the end of the season. The 2009 season was yet again spent in the Second League that is the third tier of Latvian football. The club finished in the 4th place, being promoted to the First League. In 2010 ambitions got higher as Romāns Lajuks became the president of the team. Several players with Latvian Higher League experience were invited to join, and not surprisingly the team won the Latvian First League that year, being promoted to the Latvian Higher League.

In 2011, before the start of the season, the club's name was changed to its current version FB Gulbene. For the past few years FB Gulbene have actively co-worked with several Japanese football academies, giving their players a chance to play in Europe. Club's ex-president Romāns Lajuks was familiar with the Embassy of Japan Deputy Head of Mission Mr.Takeshi. In 2011 the club finished the Latvian Higher League championship in the 7th place. Finishing the 2012 season in the 10th place they were automatically relegated from the Latvian Higher League.

In 2016, the club applied to participate in the Northeastern Division of the Latvian Second League.

Honours
 Latvian First League champions (2)
 2010, 2014
 LFF Fair-play award (2)
2010, 2011

Managers

League and Cup history

Sponsors

Players and staff

Current squad
Entry for the 2015 Latvian First League season, according to LFF.lv

Staff

References

External links
  Official website
  Official Latvian Football Federation website

 
Gulbene
Football clubs in Latvia
Association football clubs established in 2005
2005 establishments in Latvia